Mr Model México is an annual male beauty pageant aimed for young men throughout Mexico who are between the ages of eighteen and twenty-seven and who meet the necessary qualities to best represent the country at an international level. Founded in 2010 by Óscar Servin, the organization also looks to instill values and awareness in the nation's youth by promoting a healthy physical and social lifestyle. Mr Model México has been held uninterruptedly since 2011 and is responsible for selecting the country's delegates to the Mister International and Mister Global competitions, among others.

Titleholders
Below are the annual winners of the Mr Model México title, listed in ascending order. Alongside their names are the state they represented, the venue which played host to their victory, and the primary international pageant they took part in.

Representatives at major male pageants
Color Key

Mister International

Mister Supranational

Mister World

Mister Global

See also
Oscar servin
Mr Mexico Model
Mr Model Mexico SA de CV

Mexico
Mexican awards
Beauty pageants in Mexico
Recurring events established in 2010
2010 establishments in Mexico
Mister Global by country